The discography for the American rock band The Explosion.

Studio albums
 Flash Flash Flash  (July 18, 2000) Jade Tree Records
 Black Tape (October 5, 2004) Virgin Records
 Bury Me Standing'  (February 14, 2012) Tarantulas Records

EPs
 The Explosion  (April 4, 2000) Jade Tree Records
 Steal This (October 31, 2000) Revelation Records
 Sick of Modern Art (October 31, 2003) Tarantulas Records
 Red Tape (October 31, 2004) Tarantulas Records
 Here I Am (October 31, 2005) Virgin Records
 No Revolution (October 31, 2005) Virgin Records

Live albums
 Live in Boston  (June 21, 2005) Instant Live
 Live from the Troubadour (October 31, 2005) Tarantulas Records

Compilation
 Location Is Everything, Vol. 1'' (April 16, 2002) Jade Tree Records

Singles

References

Explosion, The
Rock music group discographies